The bronze-tailed plumeleteer (Chalybura urochrysia) is a species of hummingbird in the "emeralds", tribe Trochilini of subfamily Trochilinae. It is found in Colombia, Costa Rica, Ecuador, Nicaragua, and Panama.

Taxonomy and systematics

Most taxonomic systems assign three subspecies to the bronze-tailed plumeleteer, the nominate C. u. urochrysia, C. u. melanorrhoa, and C. u. isaurae. However, BirdLife International's Handbook of the Birds of the World (HBW) adds C. u. intermedia, which the others treat as a subspecies of the white-vented plumeleteer (C. buffonii). Subspecies melanorrhoa and isaurae have at times been suggested as separate species.
The bronze-tailed and white-vented plumeleteers are the only species in their genus.

Description

Both sexes of all subspecies have a black maxilla and tip of the mandible; the rest of the mandible is dull pink to dark red. Males of the nominate subspecies have metallic green upperparts and glittering green underparts, with long fluffy white undertail coverts. Their tails are bronze-green. Females are also metallic green above but gray below with green flecks on the side. Their undertail coverts are grayish white and their outer tail feathers tipped with gray. Immature birds resemble the adults with buffy to cinnamon fringing on the feathers of the crown, nape, and rump. 

Males of subspecies C. u. melanorrhoa have darker green upperparts than the nominate, with purplish bronze uppertail coverts. Their underparts are darker with a dusky bronze belly and shorter, sooty blackish, undertail coverts. Their tail is purplish black. Females are a darker gray below than the nominate and have more green flecking. Males of subspecies C. u. isaurae have a blue throat and breast, a bluish green belly, and a brighter bronze tail than the nominate. Females have pale gray underparts with little or no green flecks.

Distribution and habitat

Subspecies C. u. melanorrhoa of the bronze-tailed plumeleteer is the northernmost. It is found from eastern Nicaragua into Costa Rica and has a few records in eastern Honduras. C. u. isaurae is found on the Caribbean slope and locally on the Pacific slope of Panama and into extreme northwestern Colombia. The nominate is found from eastern Panama's Darién Province through north-central and western Colombia into northwestern Ecuador. The species inhabits the interior and edges of humid forest, mature secondary forest, and semi-open landscapes such as banana plantations and gardens. It shuns open areas.

(Note that the map includes the southwestern Ecuador range of the intermedia subspecies of white-vented plumeleteer.)

Behavior

Movement

Subspecies C. u. melanorrhoa of bronze-tailed plumeleteer is known to make local seasonal movements, probably to find flowering plants. Movements of the other two subspecies, if any, are not known.

Feeding

The bronze-tailed plumeleteer mostly forages for nectar from the understory to the mid-strata, but will visit epiphytes in the sub-canopy. It especially favors Heliconia and aggressively defends patches of them and other rich nectar sources. It has also been documented to feed on Renealmia, Costus, Psychotria, Malvaviscus, Acanthaceae, Inga, and others. In addition to nectar, it captures small arthropods mainly by hawking from a perch but also by gleaning from foliage.

Breeding

The bronze-tailed plumeleteer breeds in Costa Rica between December and June, though mostly from February to April. In Colombia, it also appears to breed between February and April. Its nest is best known from Costa Rica; there it makes a deep cup nest of pale plant down and fibers bound with spiderweb and covered on the outside with moss and some lichen.

Vocalization

What is thought to be the bronze-tailed plumeleteer's song is "a soft, nasal, scratchy, trilled phrase, ter-twee-ee-ee-ee-ee....ter-twee-ee-ee...". It makes "a drawn-out descending chattering trill" when chasing and also "loud chup and chip notes".

Status

The International Union for Conservation of Nature follows HBW taxonomy and so includes the intermedia subspecies of white-vented plumeleteer with this species. It has assessed the bronze-tailed plumeleteer as being of Least Concern, though its population size is not known and is believed to be decreasing. Much of its habitat has been destroyed in Central America but it is still locally common at many sites.

References

bronze-tailed plumeleteer
Birds of Honduras
Birds of Nicaragua
Birds of Panama
Birds of the Tumbes-Chocó-Magdalena
bronze-tailed plumeleteer